Goodyear Platform was a railway station on the Sandown railway line in the then-industrial suburb of Camellia in Sydney, Australia. It opened in January 1934 and served the Goodyear tyre factory in Camellia. The closure of Goodyear station preceded the closure of Hardies and Sandown.

Goodyear was among a number of companies that had private sidings on the line.

Neighbouring stations 
Cream Of Tartar Works Platform, which was located down from the station, closed in July 1959.

References 

Disused railway stations in Sydney